Jane was an electronic duo consisting of Panda Bear (Noah Lennox) of Animal Collective and Scott Mou. The two worked together at Other Music and recorded and practiced at Mou's house.

Discography

Albums
 Paradise (2002, self-released)
 COcOnuts (2002, self-released, Psych-o-path records)
 Berserker (2005, Paw Tracks)

References

American electronic musicians
Musical groups established in 2002
Musical groups disestablished in 2007